Usha Barthakur (1912-1993) was an Indian politician. She was a Member of Parliament, representing Assam in the Rajya Sabha the upper house of India's Parliament as a member of the Indian National Congress. She was a student of St Mary's college in Shillong

References

Rajya Sabha members from Assam
Indian National Congress politicians
Women members of the Rajya Sabha
Date of birth missing
1912 births
1993 deaths